The Army of the Rhine  was formed in December 1791, for the purpose of bringing the French Revolution to the German states along the Rhine River. During its first year in action (1792), under command of Adam Philippe Custine, the Army of the Rhine participated in several victories, including Mainz, Frankfurt and Speyer. Subsequently, the army underwent several reorganizations and merged with the Army of the Moselle to form the Army of the Rhine and Moselle on 20 April 1795.

Revolutionary Wars
The Army of the Rhine (Armée du Rhin) was one of the main French Revolutionary armies operated in the Rhineland theater, principally in the Rhine River valley, from 1791 to 1795. At its creation, the Army of the Rhine had 88,390 men. It was formed on 14 December 1791, to defend France's eastern frontier in conjunction with two other armies, the Army of the North and the Army of the Center (name changed in October 1792 to Army of the Moselle). These armies were subdivided, fresh forces were raised and gradually grew until, by 30 April 1793, eleven armies encircled France on its coastal and the land frontiers. In October 1792, a portion of the army was used to form the Army of the Vosges but these units rejoined the Army of the Rhine on 15 March 1793.

Song of Glory
In the first months of fighting, victories for France were few. Although Custine had succeeded in driving the ecclesiastical authorities from the Swiss village of Porrentruy by 27 April 1792, this singular victory was accomplished largely through the enterprises of a local uprising assisted by some advanced guard and it was the last French victory for several weeks: subsequently, the borders of France had been assaulted by the Habsburgs and their allies.

Although much of the spring and summer of 1792 action continued throughout in the border regions with Belgium, the cities along the Upper Rhine, especially the city of Strasbourg, felt under threat of invasion by the Habsburg armies massing on the east side of the Rhine River. On 25 April 1792, Philippe Friedrich Dietrich, mayor of Strasbourg, asked a guest, Claude Joseph Rouget de Lisle, to compose a song to rally against the Habsburg threat. That evening, Rouget de Lisle wrote "Chant de guerre pour l'Armée du Rhin" (English: "War Song for the Army of the Rhine"), and dedicated the song to Marshal Nicolas Luckner, a Bavarian in French service. The melody soon became the rallying call to the Revolution: Allons enfants de la Patrie (Arise, children of the Fatherland)/Le jour de gloire est arrivé! (The day of glory has arrived!). It was renamed "La Marseillaise".

Successes under Custine's command
The French government ordered Luckner to take command of the Army of the North, and Custine replaced him as overall commander of the Army of the Rhine in Spring 1793. Under his experienced command, the Army took several important positions on the Rhine, including at Speyer, Mainz, Limburg and Frankfurt (see chart of battles below).

Final reorganization
On 29 December 1794, the left wing of the Army and the right wing of the Army of the Moselle combined to form the Army besieging Mainz. The rest of the Army of the Moselle united with the Army of the Rhine on 20 April, to form the Army of the Rhine and Moselle. This army united with the Army of Sambre-et-Meuse to form the Army of Germany on 29 September 1797.

Principal battles

1793 Order of Battle
In its five-year history, the Army had several Orders of Battle.  This is the OOB at the beginning of the 1793 campaign.

Right wing
 Column Munnier
National Guard
1st and 2nd Battalions Haute-Saône
2nd Battalion Nièvre
4th Battalion Vosges
4th Battalion Seine-et-Oise
3rd Battalion Bas-Rhin
2nd Battalion Puy-de-Dôme
1st, 3rd Battalions Ain
3rd Battalion Grenadiers de l'Indre-et-Loire
2nd Battalion Rhône-et-Loire
Total  20 battalions

Center
 Column Custine, positioned at Mainz.
Grenadiers (1st, 2nd, 3rd and 4th battalions)
57th Infantry Regiment (two battalions)
62nd Infantry Regiment (one battalion)
82nd Infantry Regiment (one battalion)
National Guard
2nd Battalion Ain
4th Battalion Haut-Rhin
9th and 10th Battalions Haute-Saône
4th Battalion Calvados
10th Battalion Meurthe
2nd Battalion Républicque
1st Battalion Chasseurs républicains
3rd, 7th, and 8th Battalions Vosges
5th and 6th Battalions Bas-Rhin
1st Battalion Fédérés Nationaux
2nd Battalion Seine-et-Oise
14th Cavalry Regiment (3 squadrons)
2nd Chasseurs à Cheval (light cavalry) (1 squadron)
7th Chasseurs à Cheval(4 squadrons)
10th Chasseurs à Cheval (5 squadrons)
Total 26 battalions, 12 squadrons

Left wing
Positioned at Bingen.
1st Infantry Brigade Neuwinger
Brigade Houchard
7th Light Infantry Regiment (1st Battalion)
36th Infantry Regiment (1 battalion)
37th Infantry Regiment (1 battalion)
National Guard
4th and 6th Battalions Jura
2nd Battalion Haute-Rhin
1st Battalion Seine-et-Loire
1st and 2nd Battalions Vosges
8th Chasseurs à Cheval (4 squadrons)

2nd Brigade Gilot
13th Infantry Regiment
48th Infantry Regiment
National Guard
1st Battalion Haute-Rhin
1st Battalion Bas-Rhin
1st Battalion Correze
3rd Battalion Nievre

Cavalry
 Beaurevoir
2nd Chasseurs à Cheval (3 squadrons)
2nd Cavalry Regiment (3 squadrons
3rd Cavalry Regiment (3 squadrons)
9th Cavalry Regiment (3 squadrons)
11th Cavalry Regiment (3 squadrons)
12th Cavalry Regiment (3 squadrons)
Total 22 squadrons

Reserves
Grenadiers (12 companies)
6th Battalion of Chasseurs
2nd Infantry Regiment
2nd Carbine Regiment (3 Squadrons)
16th Dragoon Regiment (3 squadrons)
National Guard
6th, 10th and 13 Battalions Vosges
5th Battalion de l'Eure
6th Battalion Calvados
12h Battalion Haute-Saône
Hussards de la Liberté (unknown )
National Gendarmarie
Reserve totals  8 battalions, 12 squadrons, 2 platoons

Commanders
Stability of command of the Army of the Rhine reflected the overall chaos of the French Revolutionary governments, especially in the years 1791–1794.  Four of the generals serving in those years were guillotined (see chart below).

Other incarnations
An army of the Bourbon Restoration bore this name. In 1815 during the Hundred Days the V Corps – Armée du Rhin under the command of General Jean Rapp, was cantoned near Strassburg, and fought holding actions against contingents of Russians and Austrians, the largest of which was the Battle of La Suffel on  fought on 28 June 1815.

This name was also used for the French military forces posted to Germany during the Occupation of the Rhineland (1919–1930), following the First World War.

Related people
People known to have served in this Armée include:
 General Baraguey d'Hilliers
 General Custine
 Antoine Marie Chamans de Lavalette
 The utopian socialist Charles Fourier (1794–1795)
 General Victor Claude Alexandre Fanneau de Lahorie
 Jean Théophile Victor Leclerc
 General Louis-Théobald Ihler
 General François-Joseph Offenstein
 Captain Claude Joseph Rouget de Lisle writer of La Marseillaise
 General Charles Pichegru
 Balthazar Alexis Henri Schauenburg

Notes

Sources

Further reading
 

Rhine
Rhine
War of the First Coalition
Military units and formations established in 1791
1791 establishments in France